Antoine Vieillard de Boismartin, (1747 in Paris – 13 January 1815 in Saint-Lô) was a French lawyer and playwright.

Before the French Revolution, Vieillard de Boismartin was a lawyer at parlement de Rouen. He later held several political and judicial positions, including three times mayor of Saint-Lô.

The father of poet and critic Pierre-Ange Vieillard, Vieillard de Boismartin was a member of the Légion d’honneur.

Publications 
Theatre
 Almanzor, tragedy in five acts and in verse, with Decroix, Rouen, Behourt, 1771, in-8°.
 Blanchard, ou le Siège de Rouen, tragedy in five acts and in verse, Rouen, 1777, in-8°, presented on stage, with large changes, at the end of 1792, and preinted again, Saint-Lô, P.-F. Gomont, 1793, in-8°.
 Théramène, ou Athènes sauvée, tragedy in five acts and in verse, Saint-Lô, P.F. Gomont, an v, in-8°.
Law
 Lettre écrite par un avocat, soldat citoyen, à ses enfants, au sujet de la révolution, Paris, Cailleau, 1789, in-8°.
 Mémoire justificatif pour Jacques Verdure père, Marie-Marguerite, Marie-Madeleine, Jacques Sénateur et Pierre Verdure, ses enfants, tous accusés de parricide et prisonniers ès prison de la conciergerie du Palais, Rouen, Pierre Seyer, 1787, in-8° de 144 p.

Sources 
 Joseph-Marie Quérard, La France littéraire, ou Dictionnaire bibliographique des savants, historiens et gens de lettres de la France, ainsi que des littérateurs étrangers qui ont écrit en français, plus particulièrement pendant les XVIIIe XIXe, t.10, Paris, Firmin Didot, 1839, p. 149.

External links 
 Antoine Vieillard de Boismartin on Data.bnf.fr
 Almanzor on Gallica

18th-century French dramatists and playwrights
Chevaliers of the Légion d'honneur
Writers from Paris
1747 births
1815 deaths